Olha Oleksandrivna Lyakhova (born 18 March 1992) is a Ukrainian middle-distance runner. She won bronze medals at the 2018 European Championships and 2019 European Indoor Championships.

International competitions

Personal bests
Outdoor
400 metres – 52.05 (Donetsk 2013)
800 metres – 1:58.64 (Rieti 2015)
1000 metres – 2:37.46 (Berlin 2018)
Indoor
400 metres – 53.42 (Sumy 2017)
800 metres – 2:00.92 (Metz 2017)
3000 metres – 9:39.62 (Sumy 2019)

References

External links
 

1992 births
Living people
People from Rubizhne
Ukrainian female middle-distance runners
World Athletics Championships athletes for Ukraine
European Athletics Championships medalists
Athletes (track and field) at the 2016 Summer Olympics
Olympic athletes of Ukraine
Universiade medalists in athletics (track and field)
Universiade silver medalists for Ukraine
Athletes (track and field) at the 2019 European Games
European Games medalists in athletics
European Games gold medalists for Ukraine
Medalists at the 2017 Summer Universiade
Sportspeople from Luhansk Oblast
20th-century Ukrainian women
21st-century Ukrainian women